Bijnor district is one of the 75 districts in the state of Uttar Pradesh in India. Bijnor city is the district headquarters. The government of Uttar Pradesh seeks it to be included in National Capital Region (NCR) due to its close proximity to NCT of Delhi.

Bijnor is notable for its sugarcane production and mills, with two of the top five sugar mills situated in the district.

History
Bijnor district was created in 1817 out of part of Moradabad district, and it was originally called Nagina district after its headquarters at Nagina. The headquarters was relocated to Bijnor in 1824, although the district was still called "Nagina district" until 1837, when it officially became known as Bijnor district.

Medieval history
In 1399, the district was ravaged by Timur. Later, during the time of Akbar, Bijnor was part of his Mughal Empire. In the early 18th century, the Rohilla Pashtuns established their independence in the area called by the Rohilkhand. Around 1748, the Rohilla chief Ali Mohammed Khan made his first annexations in Bijnor, the rest of which soon fell under the Rohilla domination. The northern districts were granted by Ali Mohammed Khan to Khurshid Ahmed Baig, who gradually extended his influence west of the Ganges and at Delhi, receiving the title of Najib-ud-daula with the position of the paymaster of the Mughal forces. Marathas invaded Bijnor who was also instigated by enemies of Rohillas, leading to several battles. Rohilla chief, Najib, who sided with Ahmad Shah Abdali in Panipat, was made vizier of the empire.

Colonial era
In 1772 the Nawab of Oudh made a treaty with the Rohillas, to expel the Marathas in return for a money payment. Nawab of Oudh carried out his part of the bargain, but the Rohilla chieftains refused to pay. In 1774 the Nawab concluded with the East India Company government of Calcutta a treaty of alliance, and he then called upon the British, in accordance with its terms, to supply a brigade to assist him in enforcing his claims against the Rohillas. This was done; in the Rohilla War, the Rohillas were driven beyond the Ganges to the east, and Bijnor was incorporated in the territories of the nawab, who in the same year (1774) ceded it to the British East India Company. During the rebellion of 1857, Bijnor was occupied by the Nawab of Najibabad, a grandson of Zabita Khan, on 1 June. The Barha Sayyids of Bijnor, who were hereditary enemies of the Rohillas, threw their hat in their lot with the Rohillas Pashtuns and fought on their side almost to the last man during the rebellion. In spite of fighting between the Hindus and the Muslim Pashtuns, the Nawab succeeded in maintaining his position until 21 April 1858, when he was defeated by the British at Nagina.

Geography 
Bijnor, or more correctly Bijnaur, occupies the north-west corner of the Moradabad Division (historically, Rohilkhand or Bareilly region).
The western boundary is formed throughout by the deep stream of the river Ganges, beyond which lie the four districts of Dehradun, Saharanpur, Muzaffarnagar, and Meerut. To the north and north-east in the hill country of Garhwal, the dividing line being the submontane road, which runs from Haridwar along the foot of the Himalayas to Ramnagar, Haldwani, and Tanakpur. This road, popularly known as the Kandi Saradk, belongs throughout its length to Garhwal, the transfer having taken place a few years since. On the east the Phika river for the greater part of its course constitutes the boundary, separating this district from Nainital and Moradabad, as far as its junction with the Ramganga; and to the south lie the Thakurdwara Tehsil of Moradabad. Amroha and Hasanpur tahsils of Amroha District. The boundary being conventional and undetermined by natural features. The total area of the district is liable to change slightly from time to time by reason of the erratic action of the Ganges and Ramganga: In 1906 it amounted to  the average for the last five years being .

There remains the low fringe of Khadir along the Ganges to the west. This generally resembles the lowlands that skirt the rivers of the interior, the low flats which adjoin the stream itself being purely alluvial in character, while above them rises a terrace of higher ground extending inland as far as the chain of stagnant morasses lying immediately under the bangar cliff.

Demographics

According to the 2011 census Bijnor district has a population of 3,682,713, roughly equal to the nation of Liberia or the US state of Oklahoma. This gives it a ranking of 74th in India (out of a total of 640). Its population growth rate over the decade 2001-2011 was 17.64%. Bijnor has a sex ratio of 913 females for every 1000 males, and a literacy rate of 70.43%. Scheduled Castes and Scheduled Tribes make up 21.38% and 0.08% of the population respectively.

Religion

Majority of the people of the district follow Hinduism followed closely by adherents of Islam. Sikhism is followed by a little more than one percent of the population. Jainism, Christianity and  Buddhism have small number of adherents.

Languages

Hindi and Urdu are the official languages. At the time of the 2011 Census of India, 76.33% of the population of the district spoke Hindi, 22.53% Urdu and 0.96% Punjabi as their first language.

Administration

Politics
The MP of Bijnor is Malook Nagar. He represents Bahujan Samaj Party.

Assembly constituencies
Najibabad, Chandpur, Noorpur, Dhampur, Nagina (reserved), Bijnor, Barhapur, Nehtaur (Reserved)

Settlements

Urban
 Afzalgarh city
 Basi Kiratpur
 Bijnor city
 Chandok
 Chandpur city
 Dhampur city
 Haldaur city 
 Jhalu town
 Mandawar town
 Nagina city 
 Najibabad city
 Nehtaur
 Noorpur city
 Sahaspur town
 Seohara town 
 Sherkot city

Rural
 

 Askaripur
 Bahupura
 Harewali
 Linderpur
 Mandawali
 Nindru
 Pakhanpur
 Ratangarh
 Shahzadpur
 Tajpur

Economy
Bijnor district has a vast sugar industry with total nine sugar mills of which Dhampur mill and Bundki mill are among India's top sugar mills. Approximately 2.09 lakh hectares of land is dedicated to sugarcane farming.

Notable people

Najib ad-Dawlah, Mughal serviceman and founder of Najibabad
Raashid Alvi, politician
Lokendra Singh Chauhan , politician
Vishal Bhardwaj, film director and producer
Rahul Chaudhari, professional kabaddi player, gold medal winner in the 2016 South Asian Games as member of India national kabaddi team
Bakht Khan, Indian rebel chief associated with Indian Rebellion of 1857
Dushyant Kumar, Hindi-language poet
Om Kumar, politician
Manoj Kumar Paras, politician
Jagdish Prasad Mathur, politician
Prakash Mehra, film director and producer
Shadab Nazar, first-class cricketer
Swami Omvesh, politician
Hamid Afaq Qureshi, historian
Azizur Rahman, politician
Munshiram Singh, politician
Virendra Singh, Indian physicist
Suchi, politician
Tasleem, politician
Ruchi Veera, politician

References

External links

Bijnor website

 
Districts of Uttar Pradesh
Minority Concentrated Districts in India